David Butler-Jones is a Canadian physician and public servant who served as the 1st chief public health officer of Canada from the position's formation on October 23, 2004 to June 2013. The chief public health officer was the head of the Public Health Agency of Canada (PHAC) until the 2014 omnibus budget bill, in which the 28th Canadian Ministry of Stephen Harper decided to reorganize the management structure of PHAC and institute a parallel Presidential structure to govern the organization that then could be staffed by non-medical and non-scientific personnel.

Biography 
As the chief public health officer, Butler-Jones was both the lead health professional in the government and the deputy minister for PHAC. Over the course of his career, he worked in many parts of Canada in both public health and clinical medicine.

Previously, he taught at both the undergraduate and graduate levels and was involved as a researcher in public health issues. He was a professor in the Faculty of Medicine at the University of Manitoba as well as a clinical professor with the Department of Community Health and Epidemiology at the University of Saskatchewan's College of Medicine.

From 1995 to 2002, Butler-Jones was chief medical health officer and executive director of the Population Health and Primary Health Services Branches for the Province of Saskatchewan.

In professional organizations, he served as president of the Canadian Public Health Association; vice president of the American Public Health Association; chair of the Canadian Roundtable on Health and Climate Change; international regent on the board of the American College of Preventive Medicine; member of the Governing Council for the Canadian Population Health Initiative; chair of the National Coalition on Enhancing Preventive Practices of Health Professionals; and co-chair of the Canadian Coalition for Public Health in the 21st Century.

In recognition of his work in the field of public health, York University's Faculty of Health and Carleton University have awarded him an honorary doctor of laws degree. The University of Waterloo conferred a doctor of science degree on him in 2017. He is a recipient of The Canadian Public Health Association R D Defries Award, its highest honour. He has also been recognized by the College of Family Physicians and Scotiabank Family Medicine Lectureship and received the Medal of Service from The Canadian Medical Association for "his outstanding and exceptional contribution to health care in Canada" as well as the President's Award of the Public Health Physicians of Canada.

After a stroke in 2012, Butler-Jones stepped down as chief public health officer in June 2013 to focus on rehabilitation. He was succeeded by Gregory Taylor. Following his recovery, Butler-Jones has worked in a variety of roles, speaking, teaching and serving on boards, as well as advising on public health and health system issues, especially as they relate to indigenous health.

References

Year of birth missing (living people)
Living people
Canadian public health doctors
Members of the United Church of Canada